Sultan Al-Balawi (born 26 December 1979) is a Saudi football player.

References

1979 births
Living people
Saudi Arabian footballers
Al-Watani Club players
Al-Taawoun FC players
Al-Suqoor FC players
Saudi First Division League players
Saudi Professional League players
Saudi Second Division players
Association football goalkeepers